Charles Timothy Lowen (born 12 September 1992) is an English former first-class cricketer.

Lowen was born at Enfield in September 1992. He moved to Wales as a child, where he was educated in Swansea at both Olchfa School and Gower College. From there he went up to Loughborough University, where he played two first-class cricket matches for Loughborough MCCU against Surrey and Kent in 2016. Playing as a wicket-keeper, he scored 121 runs in his two matches, recording two half centuries and a high score of 66. Behind the stumps he took two catches and stumpings. In addition to playing first-class cricket, Lowen has also played minor counties cricket for Wales Minor Counties and Herefordshire.

References

External links

1992 births
Living people
People from Enfield, London
People educated at Olchfa School
Alumni of Loughborough University
English cricketers
Wales National County cricketers
Herefordshire cricketers
Loughborough MCCU cricketers